Little Big Man is a 1964 novel by American author Thomas Berger.  Often described as a satire or parody of the western genre, the book is a modern example of picaresque fiction.  Berger made use of a large volume of overlooked first-person primary materials, such as diaries, letters, and memoirs, to fashion a wide-ranging and entertaining tale that comments on alienation, identity, and perceptions of reality.  Easily Berger's best known work, Little Big Man was made into a popular 1970 film by Arthur Penn.  It has been called "Berger's response to the great American myth of the frontier, representing as it does most of the central traditions of American literature."

Plot 
The novel is structured as a recorded narrative of the purported exploits of 121-year-old Jack Crabb, a white male who was raised by the Cheyenne nation, as he describes his wanderings across the nineteenth-century American West to Ralph Fielding Snell, a somewhat gullible "Man of Letters."  Though unknown to conventional history, Crabb has supposedly crossed paths with many of the West's notable figures, including Wild Bill Hickok, Wyatt Earp, Buffalo Bill, and George Armstrong Custer.  At various times captured, rescued, escaped, and returned to or from both white and Native American societies of the time, Crabb also claims to be the "sole white survivor" of the Battle of the Little Bighorn.

Characters 
Jack Crabb
Old Lodge Skins
Mrs. Pendrake
Rev. Silas Pendrake
Allardyce T. Meriweather
Gen. George Armstrong Custer
Wild Bill Hickok
Olga
Burns Red in the Sun
Younger Bear
Sunshine
Shadow That Comes in Sight
Caroline Crabb
Amelia
Ralph Fielding Snell, "Man of Letters"
Buffalo Wallow Woman
Little Horse
Digging Bear, Little Elk, and Corn Woman
Amanda Teasdale

Major themes
As Berger's protagonist ventures back and forth between the Plains Indians and the whites, he finds himself at home in neither culture.  Similarly, as Jack's roles  vary over the course of his wanderings, from Cheyenne warrior to Army scout to small-time huckster, etc., so does the style of the narrative, as Berger draws on the great variety of themes found in the Western genre.

Literary significance and reception
Although the novel made it from hardback to paperback publication, sales were modest.  Earning no serious critical attention at first, Little Big Man stayed on the literary scene through word-of-mouth.

Awards and nominations
In 1965, Berger received a Richard and Hinda Rosenthal Award, National Institute of Arts and Letters, and a Western Heritage Award, for Little Big Man.

Adaptations 
Actor Marlon Brando owned the film rights to the book for several years, but was unable to secure backing. The project went to Arthur Penn, who directed Little Big Man from a screenplay adapted by Calder Willingham.  It was released in 1970, and starred Dustin Hoffman, Faye Dunaway, and Chief Dan George.

Sequel 
In 1999 Berger's The Return of Little Big Man was published, continuing the story of Jack Crabb. In it Crabb recounts his recollections of the killing of Wild Bill Hickok, the Gunfight at the OK Corral, the killing of Sitting Bull, Buffalo Bill's Wild West Show, and the Columbian Exposition.

Notes

References

Further reading 
 Barra, Allen. "Thomas Berger, Author of 'Little Big Man' Passes".  True West Magazine, July 24, 2014 (obituary).
 Barra, Allen. "When the Tall Tale Grew Bigger".  The Atlantic, October 2, 2014.
 Boggs, Johnny D. "Bitter Tears for Little Big Man". True West Magazine, August 2014.
 Landon, Brooks. Understanding Thomas Berger, University of South Carolina Press, 2009.
 Madden, David (editor). Critical Essays on Thomas Berger, G.K. Hall, 1995.
 Wahlbrinck, Bernd. The Illustrated Companion to Thomas Berger’s "Little Big Man" and "The Return of Little Big Man", Tumbleweed 2019, 978-3-9821463-0-0

External links 
The Academe Blog | America Re-Imagined, in Retrospect: Fifty Notable American Novels about the “West”: 1-2
Reason.com | Return of Little Big Man
Sidekick to History (Review of The Return of Little Big Man, New York Times May 9, 1999).

1964 American novels
American novels adapted into films
Picaresque novels
Western (genre) novels
Novels by Thomas Berger (novelist)
Cultural depictions of Wild Bill Hickok
Cultural depictions of Buffalo Bill
Cultural depictions of Wyatt Earp
Cultural depictions of George Armstrong Custer
Dial Press books